Ralph Votapek (born 1939 in Milwaukee, Wisconsin) is an American pianist notable for winning the First Van Cliburn International Piano Competition in 1962; the inaugural competition's First Place prize was $10,000. He is the Jury Chairman of the 2022 (EIGHTH) Cliburn International Amateur Piano Competition

From the age of nine, he studied music at the Wisconsin Conservatory in Milwaukee, as well as Northwestern University, Manhattan, and Juilliard. Votapek was awarded the Naumburg Award in 1959, and performed his debut recital at New York's Town Hall. After winning the First Van Cliburn International Piano Competition in 1962, Votapek signed contracts with RCA and Sol Hurok, and made his debut at Carnegie Hall.

Votapek was a professor of piano and Artist in Residence at the Michigan State University College of Music, and served there for 36 years before retiring in 2004.

References

External links 

1939 births
Living people
American classical pianists
Male classical pianists
American male pianists
Michigan State University faculty
Musicians from Milwaukee
Prize-winners of the Van Cliburn International Piano Competition
20th-century American pianists
Classical musicians from Wisconsin
21st-century classical pianists
20th-century American male musicians
21st-century American male musicians
21st-century American pianists